The Wimbledon Effect (Japanese: ウィンブルドン現象, rōmaji: Uinburudon Genshō, literally "Wimbledon Phenomenon") is a chiefly British and Japanese analogy, which possibly originated in Japan, that compares the tennis fame of the Wimbledon Championships with the economic success of the United Kingdom's financial services industries – especially those clustered in the City of London.

The point of the analogy is that a national and international institution (the annual tennis tournament at  Wimbledon) can be highly successful despite the lack of strong native competition, as in modern tennis Britain has produced very few Wimbledon singles champions, with only Anne Jones, Virginia Wade and  Andy Murray winning the tournament in the Open Era.

Financial context
London's financial industry has boomed since the deregulation of British financial markets (the "Big Bang") in the 1980s under the Thatcher government – but has also become dominated by foreign companies, especially American investment banks, rather than British firms (a result opposite to the original intention of the reforms).

The analogy is typically used to mark a debate over whether it matters if an industry is primarily domestically owned if easing of foreign ownership restrictions allows the economy to benefit from foreign investment and increased global competition. The phrase can be used positively to assert the economic success of liberal attitudes towards foreign ownership (and sometimes to emphasize that such attitudes promote a level playing field for domestic and foreign interests alike); or it can be used negatively to emphasize how these policies have eroded a nation's ability to produce globally leading domestic companies. This opposing perspective is represented by economic patriotism and "national champion" policies.

The analogy has also been used in policy discourses outside Britain – most notably in the business discourse of Japan, whose financial markets and other parts of the economy (as of 2006) have not yet been substantially opened up to foreign competition compared with its international peers. It has also, for instance, been used in banking reform debates in South Korea, as well as in discussing business process outsourcing in India.

Sports in Japan
The term has also frequently been appearing in sports in Japan since late 20th century, including sumo where there has been only one Japanese-born yokozuna since 1998 as most of the top players have been from Mongolia or Polynesia. Similarly in combat sports (kakutougi), K-1 was the biggest kickboxing promotion of the world, whereas Pride Fighting Championships was the biggest mixed martial arts promotion of the world. Nevertheless, both K-1 and Pride had few Japanese-born popular players or champions. The vast majority of prominent competitors in K-1 came from the Netherlands or Thailand, while Pride's biggest names were from Brazil, United States, and Russia.

See also
Economic globalization
Foreign ownership of companies of Canada

References

Further reading
"Wheeling & Dealing", Newsweek, 23 January 2006
The Competitive Position of London as a Global Financial Centre, report by City of London Corporation & Z/Yen, November 2005
"Spate of takeover bids 'sign of economic strength'", Financial Times, 14 November 2005
"Buying British", The Guardian, 1 November 2005
"Foreign Penetration of Japan's Investment-Banking Market: Will Japan Experience the 'Wimbledon Effect'?", discussion paper by Nicole Pohl, Shorenstein Asia-Pacific Research Center, Stanford University, July 2002
"What is the Wimbledon Effect shocking the world of sumo?", livedoor, 2 November 2005 

Economy of Japan
Economy of London
Economics effects
Financial services in the United Kingdom
Metaphors referring to sport
Sport in Japan
Wimbledon Championships
Tennis culture